Tablón de Tamará Airport  is an airport serving the village of Tablón de Tamará in the Casanare Department of Colombia. The runway and village sit on a ridge in the eastern foothills of the Colombian Andes. The runway is adjacent to and south of the village.

See also

Transport in Colombia
List of airports in Colombia

References

External links
OpenStreetMap - Tablón de Tamará
OurAirports - Tablón de Tamará
Tablón de Tamará Airport

Airports in Colombia